Thompson Lake or Lake Thompson may refer to:

in Canada
Thompson Lake (Manitoba)
Thompson Lake (York Region, Ontario), near Wilcox Lake

in New Zealand
Lake Thompson (Canterbury), one of New Zealand's lakes
Lake Thompson (Southland), another of New Zealand's lakes

in the United States
Thompson Lake (Arkansas)
Lake Thompson (California)
Thompson Lake (Maine)
Thompson Lake (Meeker County, Minnesota)
Thompson Lake (St. Louis County, Minnesota)
Thompson Lake (Gallatin County, Montana), one of Gallatin County's lakes
Thompson Lake (Granite County, Montana), one of Granite County's lakes
Thompson Lake (Park County, Montana), one of Park County's lakes
Lake Thompson (South Dakota)

See also
Thomsons Lake
Thompson Pond
Thompson's Lake (New York), abutted by Thompson's Lake State Park
West Thompson Lake